The Public Order Bill of the Parliament of the United Kingdom aims to give police greater powers to crack down on protest tactics such as those being used by climate protestors.

The Parliament of the United Kingdom's Joint Committee on Human Rights "called for key measures in the legislation to be watered down or scrapped because the laws would have a "chilling effect" on people in England and Wales seeking to exercise their legitimate democratic rights."

Details of the Bill
The Bill would introduce new offences for locking on (with 51-week sentences), interfering with key national infrastructure, obstructing major transport works, causing serious disruption by tunnelling, greater stop and search powers to prevent disruptive protests (including without suspicion), and "Serious Disruption Prevention Orders" "which can restrict people's freedom by imposing conditions on repeat offenders".

The Bill is "explicitly targeted at protesters", such as "the current outbreak of climate protests across Britain". It specifically names the protests of Extinction Rebellion, Just Stop Oil, and Insulate Britain as reasons it is needed.

Measures previously rejected by the House of Lords in Police, Crime, Sentencing and Courts Act 2022 are reintroduced. Including banning individuals from protests.

In January 2023, Prime Minister Rishi Sunak's government announced plans to amend the Public Order Bill before it becomes law "to broaden the legal definition of 'serious disruption', give police more flexibility, and provide legal clarity on when the new powers could be used."

Legislative history
The Bill was announced in the Queen's speech on 10 May 2022.

In October 2022, MPs passed the Bill by 276 votes to 231. In January 2023, the House of Lords overturned plans to increase police powers to allow them to restrict protests by 254 votes to 240. and added a clause restricting protests within 150 meters of an abortion clinic. The abortion-related provision was upheld by the House of Commons following a 299-116 division held under a free vote, while other Lords amendments were rejected.

Criticism 
In October 2022, The Parliament of the United Kingdom's Joint Committee on Human Rights has said: "it is concerned the offence could encompass demonstrators who simply link arms with each other, and that it should be amended. [...] The committee said measures relating to the obstruction of major transport works covered actions that were not intended to cause significant disruption, while those related to interference with key national infrastructure covered those that were neither "key" nor "national". The proposed serious disruption prevention orders could prevent people being able to exercise their right to protest, the committee said, and represented a "disproportionate response" to any resulting disruption. It also expressed concerns about the extension of stop and search powers, allowing police to carry out searches where there were no reasonable grounds for suspicion."In November, writing for the Financial Times, Conservative peer Camilla Cavendish called the bill "... an affront to a civilised society".

See also
Public Order Act 1986
Police, Crime, Sentencing and Courts Act 2022
Criminal Justice and Public Order Act 1994

References

2022 in British law
Proposed laws of the United Kingdom
English criminal law